Alexey Kireev (born November 13, 1985) is a Russian bobsledder who has competed since 2007. His best World Cup finish was third in a four-man event at Altenberg, Germany in December 2009.

Kireev finished eighth in the four-man event at the 2010 Winter Olympics in Vancouver.

External links
 
Aleksey Kireyev at Sports Reference

1985 births
Bobsledders at the 2010 Winter Olympics
Living people
Olympic bobsledders of Russia
Russian male bobsledders